Samuel Putnam (October 10, 1892 – January 15, 1950) was an American translator and scholar of Romance languages. He is also noteworthy as the author of Paris Was Our Mistress, a memoir on writers and artists associated with the American ex-patriate community in Paris in the 1920s and early 1930s.

Work
Putnam's most famous work is his 1949 English translation of Miguel de Cervantes's Don Quixote. It is the first version of the work in what would today be considered contemporary English; there is still archaic language, but less than in earlier English versions.

The language is formal when spoken by educated characters, but seldom old-fashioned, while the peasant characters speak in colloquial modern English. Putnam worked on the translation for 12 years. He also published a companion volume, The Portable Cervantes, that included an abridged version of his translation, in addition to English versions of two of Cervantes's Novelas ejemplares.

Daniel Eisenberg, comparing translations of Don Quixote, called Putnam's translation the most "sensitive", and by far the best documented.

Putnam's complete translation, originally published by Viking Press, was reprinted in the Modern Library, and has seldom been out of print since its publication. Putnam was also a noted translator of Rabelais. He was known for his leftist leanings (he was a columnist for the communist Daily Worker).

Putnam was the father of noted American philosopher Hilary Putnam. Hilary Putnam made his first published appearance in his father's Don Quixote translation, in a footnote explaining a joke from the text in terms of logic.

Putnam died in 1950 at the age of 57 in his home in New Jersey.

Bibliography
 Don Quixote de la Mancha translated by Samuel Putnam, with a "Translator's Introduction" by Mr. Putnam (New York: Modern Library, 1998).
 The Works of Aretino: Letters and Sonnets: Translated into English from the original Italian, with a critical and biographical essay by Samuel Putnam (New York: Covici-Friede Publishers, 1926, 1933). This book includes Pietro Aretino: A Biography Translated from the Italian of Francesco de Sanctis by Samuel Putnam.

References

External links

 
 Samuel Putnam Papers, 1908-1950 at Southern Illinois University Carbondale, Special Collections Research Center

1892 births
1950 deaths
American translators
Spanish–English translators
People from Vermilion County, Illinois
20th-century translators
Translators of Miguel de Cervantes